Cape Law is a hill in the Moffat Hills range, part of the Southern Uplands of Scotland. A sprawling summit, it is commonly ascended from Talla Linfoots to the north on the way to the higher summits to the west and east.

Subsidiary SMC Summits

References

Mountains and hills of the Southern Uplands
Mountains and hills of the Scottish Borders
Donald mountains